is a Japanese anime produced by Tatsunoko Productions in 1975.  A short-lived English adaptation aired in the U.S. in 1984. The first 13 episodes streamed in Japanese with English subtitles on Anime Sols as of spring 2013 exclusively in North America, but the website is now defunct. All 26 episodes were streaming on Viewster in several countries until the website went defunct in 2019. In the 1990s, it was followed by the much more popular Tekkaman Blade, which was dubbed in the U.S. by Saban as Teknoman.

Plot
The Earth has entered the 21st century and it is in peril. The “Green Earth” project has been abandoned and scientists look to the stars to find a “Second Earth.” The Space Angel, on its mission to find this “Second Earth,” is attacked by a group of aliens named the “Waldarians.” The Space Angel is destroyed and with it the hope of mankind. Dr. Amachi manages to create “Pegas” and the “Teksetter” system, designed to combat the aliens by augmenting a human with a certain wavelength into a Tekkaman, giving them enhanced strength abilities. Test pilots George Minami and Hiromi Amachi, along with Andro Umeda and Mutan, two alien beings from the planet Sanno, rid the dying Earth from the threat of the “Waldaster” and continue to research the “Leap Flight Engine” to reach a new home for humanity.

Production
The opening theme, “Tekkaman no Uta,” is sung by Ichirou Mizuki, written by Tatsunoko’s Planning Department (lyrics) and Asei Kobayashi (music) and arranged by Bob Sakuma, who composed all the music for the series. The character designs were done by Yoshitaka Amano (of Final Fantasy fame). The show was intended to run for 52 episodes, but was cancelled after 26 episodes. The reasons for the show's cancellation currently remain unknown.

An English-language version was created by a small independent company called William Winckler Productions. However, the dub was cancelled in mid-story with only 13 of the show’s 26 episodes produced.

Over forty-thousand original Tekkaman the Space Knight VHS video cassettes were successfully sold throughout the U.S. to major retail stores by Congress Video Group (the largest video distributor at the time), and later by L.D. Video. Congress Video sold half-hour episodes, whereas L.D. Video sold two 96-minute movie compilations.

William Winckler attempted to stay as true to the original Japanese series as possible, with as little editing of violence as possible, and retaining all the original Japanese music and sound effects. This was in stark contrast to Science Ninja Team Gatchaman, another Tatsunoko series which was dubbed by Sandy Frank as Battle of the Planets.

English Cast

Bill Hedderly Jr. as Barry Gallagher / Tekkaman
Kathy Pruitt as Patricia Richardson / Mutan
Reginald Bennett as Andro
Clancy Syrko as Pegas / Randrox / Narrator
Jean Veloz as Mutan / Computer
Robert Winckler as Dr. Richardson / Emperor Devoral

Japanese Cast

Katsuji Mori as Joji Minami/Tekkaman
Kan Tokumaru as Pegas
Junpei Takiguchi as Rambos
Kazue Komiya as Mutan
Kenji Utsumi as Chief Tenchi
Miyuki Ueda as Hiromi
Shinji Nakae as Narrator
Takeshi Kuwabara as Dovrai
Yasuo Yamada as Andro Umeda
Yuzuru Fujimoto as Jupiter

Episode list

Appearances in other media
Tekkaman, Andro, and Dovrai appear in the PlayStation fighting game Tatsunoko Fight as playable fighters representing their series. Tekkaman reappears in both versions of Tatsunoko vs. Capcom with the Wii version also having Tekkaman Blade; Tekkaman's mini-game involves him throwing his Tek Lancer against a horde of Waldester fighters from the early part of series.

Tekkaman also appears in the crossover anime series Infini-T Force co-produced by Tatsunoko and Digital Frontier which aired from October 3 to December 26, 2017. An anime film has been announced.

See also
 Tekkaman Blade

References

External links

CDJAPAN DVD RELEASE
 Tekkaman (Anime Mundi), detailed production information

1975 anime television series debuts
1975 Japanese television series endings
Japanese children's animated space adventure television series
Japanese children's animated science fiction television series
Japanese children's animated superhero television series
Action anime and manga
Anime with original screenplays
Science fiction anime and manga
Superheroes in anime and manga
Tatsunoko Production
TV Asahi original programming
Transforming heroes